Henninger is a family name that originated in Germany. The name is attested as 'Honigar' from the 13th century in Bavaria, and was borne by members of the nobility of the Holy Roman Empire and by the family that founded the Henninger Brewery. It is most prevalent today in Baden-Württemberg.

History
There are more than one, seemingly unrelated, Henninger branches from Germany.  Seemingly there were branches formed from a variety of spellings in the regions of Hessia, Baden, and Saxony/Bavaria/Bohemia.  The earliest origins of the Bavarian/Bohemian name date back to the Dark Ages and started with a different name altogether.  In 978, the Saxon nobleman Bruno, Graf von Arneburg, died. His grandson, Wilhelm, Graf von Lutisburg seemingly took on the additional estate of 'von Seeberg' in 1089 due to marriage.  Seeberg lies along the modern border of the Czech Republic and Bavaria in the Eger (now called Cheb) and Planá region.  At the time, it was in the Kingdom of Bohemia.  In 1200, Conrad von Seeberg, grandson of Wilhelm, founded a branch of the family, led by his son Thimo von Seeberg, near Vohburg, Bavaria.  At that time, a relative of his, perhaps a grandson, took over control of the Schloss Seeberg.  His name was Honigar von Seeberg.  His descendants held Seeberg until at least 1394.  This is the first appearance of the name in historical records.  In 1404, there appears to be a family break and another family, Schmiedel von Seeberg, began.

The name evolved to Henninger von Seeberg over the centuries.  They were ennobled by the Holy Roman Emperor for fighting the Hussites in 1423.  They were later raised to the title of Freiherr or Baron von Seeberg in 1571.  Branches of the family spread throughout the Bohemian and Hungarian kingdoms over time and Henningers von Seeberg or the derivative 'von Eberg' were listed as knights and nobles throughout those kingdoms.  Johann Wenzel Henninger von Eberg was raised to the state of Freiherr in 1744.  There is a branch that was ennobled in 1816 in Hungary known as "zu Eberka" and another branch of the family was ennobled in 1853 for military service by the Austro-Hungarian Emperor.  Lieutenant General Emmanuel Henninger, Freiherr von Eberg, was one of the regimental commanders at the Austrian victory at Custoza, Italy in 1866.  His father Johann, also an Austro-Hungarian Major General of Army, had been granted the title of Freiherr von Eberg just prior to his death.

In Bavaria, a branch of Honigar von Seeberg's family had migrated north from Vohburg to Rothenburg ob der Tauber in the early 15th century.  That family continued in the area and in 1816 purchased the Reuter brewery in Erlangen, Bavaria.  It was from Erlangen that the larger Henninger brewery family started, branching out into Frankfurt in 1869.

The first mention of the Hessian-based Henningers comes from 1423, and those from the Baden area start to occur soon after.  To date the region that has the most Henningers today is Baden-Württemberg.

Name variations and associated families
 Henninger (Frankish spelling) von Seeberg
 Henniger (Rhine spelling) von Eberg
 Hönniger
 Hennigar
 Hunninger
 Hanygar
 Henigar ze Žeberka
 von Gumpenburg
 Schmiedel von Seeberg
 Hoenniger
 Henegar
 Heninger
 Hanninger
 Haninger

Establishments
 The Henninger Brewery, located in Frankfurt, Germany.
 Anthony A Henninger High School, located in Syracuse, New York

Individuals
 Brian Henninger (born 1962), golfer
 Daniel Henninger, journalist
 Joseph Morgan Henninger (1906-1999), artist and illustrator
 John Hannygar Baron von Eberg, lord of Měšice Castle, in Tábor, Southern Bohemia, Czech Republic, built the first water flushing toilets in region in 1792, they still work today
 Lieutenant General Emmanuel Henninger, Freiherr von Seeberg, Austro-Hungarian Army
 Major General Dieter Henninger, German Republic Army
 Johann Henninger Freiherr von Eberg, Director of the Prague Technical Institute circa 1850
 Bishop Prokop Benedickt Henninger Freiherr von Eberg, Superintendent of the Wissenrhad college, Prague 1802–1809
 Adolphine Henniger von Eberg, composer and pianist - born 1813 Magdeburg, died 1887 München. See article: Delphine von Schauroth
 Commander Carl Henninger, co-founder of Kennywood Park, Pittsburgh, Pennsylvania
 John Henninger Reagan (1818-1905), United States Congressman and Senator from Texas, Postmaster General of the Confederate States of America
 William Robert Henegar III (1957-2013) Musician

Locations
 Henninger Flats, named after William K. Henninger

See also
Heninger

References

External links
 Familiengeschichtliche Blatter, Henninger, pg. 176-178, Berlin, 1943
 Deutschen Reichsstadt Eger, by R. Drivok. pg. 465-466, Böhmen, Leipzig, 1875
 Der Böhmischer Adel, by Rudolf Johann Graf Meraviglia-Crivelli, pg. 26, Prague, 1886
 https://web.archive.org/web/20110719090338/http://www.loni.homepage.t-online.de/b-p.htm
 Annalista Saxo: Reichschronik - Bruno: Das Buch vom Sächsischen Krieg. Phaidon Verlag, Essen und Stuttgart 1986 Seite 16,26,45
 https://web.archive.org/web/20071215210015/http://www.genealogie-mittelalter.de/querfurt_herren_von/wilhelm_von_lutisburg_1075/wilhelm_von_lutisburg_1075.html
 Stammbuch des bluhenden und abgestorbenen Adels in Deutschland, Vol 2. By Otto, Titan von Hefner, pg. 139
 http://www.jonhenninger.com

German-language surnames
Surnames of Czech origin